Kyimo is an administrative ward in the Rungwe district of the Mbeya Region of Tanzania. In 2016 the Tanzania National Bureau of Statistics report there were 15,466 people in the ward, from 14,033 in 2012.

Neighborhoods 
The ward has 5 neighborhoods.
 Ilenge
 Katabe
 Kibisi
 Kyimo
 Syukula

References 

Wards of Mbeya Region